Glory may refer to:

Honor and renown
 Glory (honor), high renown, praise, and honor obtained by notable achievements
 Kleos, the Greek word for "glory", often translated to "renown" (what others hear about you)

Arts and entertainment

Fictional characters
 Glory (Buffy the Vampire Slayer), in the television series Buffy the Vampire Slayer
 Glory (comics), in the Image Comics universe
 Glory, a mainline My Little Pony unicorn pony
 Glory Bailey, a character in British soap opera Coronation Street

Films
 Glory (1956 film), an American musical directed by David Butler
 Glory (1989 film), an American historical war drama directed by Edward Zwick
 Glory (2016 film), a Bulgarian drama by Kristina Grozeva and Petar Valchanov

Music

Albums
 Glory (Britney Spears album), 2016
 Glory (Kutless album), 2014
 Glory (Manafest album) or the title song, 2006
 Glory (Michael W. Smith album), 2011
 Glory (EP) or the title song, by Iggy Azalea, 2012
 The Glory Album, by Christon Gray, 2016
 Glory, by Tomas Barfod, 2015
 The Glory, by Olamide, 2016

Songs
 "Glory" (Band-Maid song) 2018
 "Glory" (Bastille song), 2017
 "Glory" (Common and John Legend song), 2014
 "Glory" (Jay-Z song), 2012
 "Glory" (KMFDM song), 1994
 "Glory Song", a 1900 gospel song written by Charles H. Gabriel
 "Glory", by Audio Adrenaline from Lift, 2001
 "Glory", by Dermot Kennedy from Without Fear, 2019
 "Glory", by Doug Wimbish from Trippy Notes for Bass, 1999
 "Glory", by Hollywood Undead from American Tragedy, 2011
 "Glory", by Jessie J from R.O.S.E., 2018
 "Glory", by JoJo from LoveJo, 2014
 "Glory", by Lil Wayne from Free Weezy Album, 2015
 "Glory", by Television from Adventure, 1978
 "Glory", by Young the Giant from Mirror Master, 2018
 "The Glory", by Kanye West from Graduation, 2007
 "The Glory", by The Cranberries from Something Else, 2017

Other art and entertainment
 Glory (Nabokov novel), a 1932 novel by Vladimir Nabokov
 Glory (Bulawayo novel), a 2022 novel by NoViolet Bulawayo
 The Glory, a 1994 novel by Herman Wouk
 Glory (sculpture), a 1999 sculpture by Gary R. Bibbs in Indianapolis, Indiana, US
 Glory, a work by Banksy
 Glory, the Pacific War counterpart to the Europa series of wargames
 Glory, a board game designed by Richard Berg published by GMT Games
 The Glory (TV series), a 2023 South Korean television series

People
 Glory (singer) (born 1979), Puerto Rican reggaeton singer
 Glory (wrestler), Christie Ricci (born 1982), American professional wrestler
 Glory Leppänen (1901–1979), Finnish actress, director and writer

Places
 Glory, Georgia, US
 Glory, Minnesota, US
 Glory, Texas, US

Religion
 Glory (religion), in Judeo-Christian religious tradition, the manifestation of God's presence
 Glory (religious iconography) or halo, a crown, circle, or disk of light that surrounds a person in art
 Glorification, term for the canonization of a saint in the Eastern Orthodox Church

Science and technology
 Glory (optical phenomenon), a halo-like optical phenomenon
 Glory (satellite), an earth science satellite which failed during launch in March 2011
 Ulmus parvifolia 'Glory', an elm cultivar

Ships
 Glory (1802 ship), an East Indiaman
 Glory-class container ship, an eight-ship series operated by COSCO Shipping
 Carnival Glory, a ship operated by Carnival Cruise Line
 French ship Gloire, various ships of the French Navy
 HMS Glory, various ships of the British Navy
 London Glory, three successive tanker ships of London & Overseas Freighters

Sports
 Glory (kickboxing), a world-wide kickboxing promotion
 Ohio Glory, a defunct American football team
 Perth Glory FC, an Australian football (soccer) team

See also

 
 
 Gloria (disambiguation)
 Glory, Glory (disambiguation)
 Glory hole (disambiguation)

ru:Глория